"THINK" is a slogan associated with the American multinational technology company IBM.

History 
The "THINK" slogan was first used by Thomas J. Watson in December 1911, while managing the sales and advertising departments at the National Cash Register Company. At an uninspiring sales meeting, Watson interrupted, saying "The trouble with every one of us is that we don't think enough. We don't get paid for working with our feet — we get paid for working with our heads". Watson then wrote THINK on the easel.

Asked later what he meant by the slogan, Watson replied, "By THINK I mean take everything into consideration. I refuse to make the sign more specific. If a man just sees THINK, he'll find out what I mean. We're not interested in a logic course."

In 1914, Watson brought the slogan with him to the Computing-Tabulating-Recording Company (CTR) and its subsidiaries, all of which later became IBM. International Time Recording, one of the subsidiaries, published a magazine for employees and customers, named Time, which, in 1935, IBM would rename to THINK. IBM continues to use the slogan. THINK is also an IBM trademark; IBM named its laptop computers ThinkPads and named a line of business-oriented desktop computers ThinkCentre.

Since 2018, IBM's main conference is called Think.

The Apple slogan "Think different" which was first used in 1997 has been widely taken as a response to IBM's THINK.

See also 
 History of IBM

References

External links 

 IBM Think
 IBM Think Conference

IBM
American advertising slogans
1910s neologisms